Mary Williams (born July 8, 1949) is a Wisconsin politician and legislator.

Born in Phillips, Wisconsin, Williams graduated from University of Wisconsin–Stevens Point. Williams served in the Wisconsin State Assembly since 2003. Williams and her husband owned Cougar Enterprises, which operates fast food restaurants in Medford, Wisconsin and the surrounding area. They have sold their restaurant properties.

She was appointed to the Wisconsin state technical college system board by Scott Walker. When her term expired in May 2021, she refused to leave the board while continuing to vote and make motions.

References

University of Wisconsin–Stevens Point alumni
Republican Party members of the Wisconsin State Assembly
Women state legislators in Wisconsin
1949 births
Living people
21st-century American politicians
21st-century American women politicians
People from Phillips, Wisconsin
People from Medford, Wisconsin